Gijón Mariners is an American football team based in Gijón, Asturias (Spain).

History
The team was established in 2001 by a group of players of flag football at the beach. They joined the Spanish league for the 2006 season, and got included on the Western Conference of the LNFA 2. They played their first game ever on that competition February 19, 2006, against Zaragoza Hurricanes with a score against of 60–6. On their second season, again in the LNFA 2, they qualified for the play-offs and only lost on the last round (semi-finals) for the championship bowl.

The success of the merchandise finally made it possible to reach the top competition, the LNFA, on the 2008 season. They finished with a 4–4 (Won-Lost) record, the best ever for a rookie team on the league's history.

Records

Trophies
Serie C: (1)
2015

International agreements
In 2012 Gijón Mariners reached an agreement with Pumas Dorados de la UNAM to exchange players and coaches from both clubs, as well as to share guidelines and training plans.

Featured players
  Mark James Murray, from Marbella Sharks.
  Nadir Mutti, from Parma Panthers (IFL).

Ring of Fame
  Mauricio Diago Jaworski, ex-player of Borregos Salvajes (ITESM), Campus Estado de México (ONEFA), Rivas Osos (LNFA) and Pieles Rojas.
  Jesús E. Sánchez, ex-player of Pumas UNAM CU (ONEFA) and Rivas Osos (LNFA).
  Alex Stolz, ex-player of  Tirol Raiders (AFL).
  Sergi Güibas, ex-player of Borregos Salvajes, Campus Toluca (ONEFA) and Badalona Dracs (LNFA).
  David Lozano, ex-player of Centinelas CGP (ONEFA) and Palermo Corsari (IFL).
  Marco Antonio Pacheco Patraca, ex-player of Centinelas CGP (ONEFA) and Troyanos.

External links 
Official website
Video Mariners

American football teams in Spain
Sport in Gijón
American football teams established in 2001
2001 establishments in Spain
Sports teams in Asturias